The São Paulo Fashion Week is a clothing trade show held semi-annually  in São Paulo, Brazil. It is notable as "Latin America's pre-eminent fashion event" and it is of the emerging fashion weeks, outside the Big Four of New York, London, Paris, and Milan, that have been established since the 1990s. It has been controversial in the past because of a "longstanding bias towards white models." In 2009 quotas were imposed that required that 10 percent of models to be "black or indigenous" as a way to foster equal opportunity.

In April 2019, male fashion model Tales Soares, artistically known as Tales Cotta, died after collapsing on the runway at the show. Soares was walking the runway  when he suddenly stumbled and fell as he was about to exit. Soares received help after falling and was taken to a hospital where he later died.

References

External links
São Paulo Fashion Week (SPFW) official site
Information on São Paulo Fashion Week (SPFW)

Fashion events in Brazil
Recurring events established in 1996
Tourist attractions in São Paulo
Fashion weeks